Claudette Schreuders (born February 6, 1973) is a South African sculptor and painter operating out of Cape Town, South Africa. She is known mainly for her carved and painted wooden figures, which have been exhibited independently and internationally in galleries and museums.   She is the first South African artist to have a sculpture acquired by the Metropolitan Museum of Art. Schreuders has been a finalist for both the Daimler Chrysler Award (South Africa) and the FNB Vita Art Prize (South Africa), which is South Africa's version of the Turner Prize.

Early life and education 
Schreuders was born in Pretoria (Tshwane), Gauteng Province, South Africa on 6 February 1973.  She is first-generation South African born to Dutch parents. Schreuders' adolescence was during the period leading up to the end of apartheid in 1994.

She attended Linden High School in Johannesburg and graduated in 1990. She attended Stellenbosch University, where she graduated with a Bachelor of Fine Arts in 1994, after which she attended the Michaelis School of Fine Art at the University of Cape Town for her Master of Fine Arts (1997).

Career 
Schreuders began exhibiting her work in 1998, with a show titled Family Tree. Her earliest bodies of work were Burnt by the Sun (2001), Crying in Public (2002),  The Long Day (2004), and The Fall (2007). She began exclusively with wood carving but has since expanded to produce bronze sculptures, lithographic prints, etchings, and drawings.

Her work has been shown in the Museum of Modern Art, the Metropolitan Museum of Art, the National Museum of African Art at the Smithsonian Institution, the Nobel Peace Center, the British Museum, and the Fowler Museum at the University of California, Los Angeles. She has two public sculptures. One is in Cape Town's Nobel Square: statues of the four South African Nobel Peace Prize laureates Nelson Mandela, FW de Klerk, Archbishop Desmond Tutu and Albert Lutuli. The other is in the Aga Kahn Walk in Nairobi, Kenya: a seven-foot wooden figure titled Thomas.

Style 

Her work has been praised as a "mastery of carving" by the Metropolitan Museum of Art and compared to the work of the other sculptors Jeff Koons and William Kentridge.  It has also been described as an "exploration of self-identity, cultural discomfort and a strong if clouded spirituality" and the depiction of figures who appear "monolithic, stoic and timeless" and "reflect the ambiguities of the search for an 'African' identity in the post-apartheid era"  and "the malleability of an African identity in the wake of apartheid."  Art critic Okwui Enwezor has said that her work "proposes a new language resulting from a synthesis of African and European figural forms."

Her wooden figures rarely deviate from what Schreuders has established as her personal style. First, her work is often autobiographical. Her first six bodies of work represented different phases of her life: her graduate show reflected her life as a student; her second collection reflected her time in residencies in foreign countries; her third reflected on the reception of her work, and the following works concerned the birth of her first child and domestic life.  Schreuders states that “I enjoy art in which you can see the life where it comes from. Art that is solely about art is not as attractive to me as when there is life outside the work.”  The wood she often uses to carve her figures is jacaranda; a wood readily available in Pretoria, her hometown. Second, the bodies are "stocky figures with slightly oversized heads and hands, carved in wood and rendered with enamel paint."  Third, her work has "small solitary figures with the aura of invisible or indeterminate narrative silences [and] generally expressionless faces that mask any overt or strong feelings." Fourth, her depictions of everyday South African life comment on the residue of South Africa's colonial past and her own relationship with South African history. For instance, one sculpture is of "a black woman with a white child on her back" and "the child is built up out of cuts, as if the child is going to fall apart into slices the moment the woman unties the blanket." Fifth her figures often have "vacant stares" and a "rigidity, even paralysis of movement" communicating that "all is not what it seems."

Influences 
Her wood carved statues often begin from a single piece of wood, akin to traditional African art practices, especially the West African colon statues and Baule Blolo sculptures native to the Ivory Coast. Colon sculptures originated as figures for indigenous rituals, but as decolonization infiltrated African society Europeans began having them commissioned as portraits of themselves. Christopher Steiner explains the importance of colon figures as a "symbol of social status ... [whose] very ownership by a Western signifies the reappropriation of Africa and is thus prized as an image that pays homage to the conquest of the continent." Schreuders has stated that the colon figures "were crucial to me in how I wanted my sculptures to look" due to their living quality.

Exhibits and Residences

References

External Sources 
Official website

People from Pretoria
South African women sculptors
1973 births
South African printmakers
Woodcarvers
Living people
University of Cape Town alumni
Stellenbosch University alumni
Women woodworkers